Albert Edward Winter Rogers (17 December 1916 – 4 May 1980) was an Australian rules footballer who played for the Hawthorn Football Club in the Victorian Football League (VFL).

Family
The son of Albert Edward Rogers, and May Teresa Rogers (1885-1980), née Murphy, Albert Edward Winter Rogers was born at Donald, Victoria on 17 December 1916.

He married Veronica Lilian Bombardier (1903-) in 1939.

Football
"A real stalwart ruckman. [Bert Rogers] can take the hard knocks, and gives great protection to the smaller men. Is very consistent in his play, although not spectacular. Joined Hawthorn in 1943".

Recruited from the Beulah Football Club in the Southern Mallee Football League.

Notes

References
 
 Football: Hawthorn Player Exonerated, The Age, (Wednesday, 2 August 1944), p.5.
 Application for the transfer of the license for the Farmers Union Hotel, at Beulah, Victoria to Albert Edward Winter Rogers: Victuallers' Licenses, The Argus, (Saturday, 27 July 1946), p.28.
 Application for the transfer of the license for the Junction Hotel, at Branxholme, Victoria to Albert Edward Winter Rogers: Victuallers' Licenses, The Argus, (Saturday, 25 August 1956), p.27.

External links 

1916 births
1980 deaths
Australian rules footballers from Victoria (Australia)
Hawthorn Football Club players